Bonosianus was a politician of the Western Roman Empire.

He served as praefectus urbi of Rome from September 25, 410, to November 28, 411.

Sources 
 Codex Theodosianus XIV 1.6a, XV 1.48a
 Prosopography of the Later Roman Empire, Volume 2, "Bonosianus"

5th-century Romans
Urban prefects of Rome